The Hoteag is a left tributary of the river Lotru in Romania. Its source is on the southern slope of Negovanu Mare peak, Lotru Mountains. It flows into the Lotru upstream from Voineasa.

References

Rivers of Romania
Rivers of Vâlcea County